Encephaloduroarteriosynangiosis (abbreviated EDAS) surgery is a neurosurgical procedure performed to treat moyamoya syndrome.

References

Neurosurgical procedures